Natter is a surname. Notable people with the surname include:

Boniface Natter, first post-Reformation abbot of Buckfast Abbey
Gérard Natter, French curler
Lorenz Natter (1705–1763), German engraver and medallist
Robert J. Natter, United States Navy admiral
Tobias G. Natter, Austrian art historian and museum director